The 1976 Giro d'Italia was the 59th running of the Giro, one of cycling's Grand Tours. It started in Catania, on 21 May, with a set of split stages and concluded in Milan, on 12 June, with another split stage, consisting of an individual time trial and a mass-start stage. A total of 120 riders from twelve teams entered the 22-stage race, that was won by Italian Felice Gimondi of the Bianchi-Campagnolo team. The second and third places were taken by Belgian Johan De Muynck and Italian Fausto Bertoglio, respectively.

Amongst the other classifications that the race awarded, Sanson's Francesco Moser won the points classification, Andrés Oliva of KAS won the mountains classification, and Magniflex's Alfio Vandi completed the Giro as the best neo-professional in the general classification, finishing seventh overall. Brooklyn finishing as the winners of the team points classification.

Teams

A total of twelve teams were invited to participate in the 1976 Giro d'Italia. Each team sent a squad of ten riders, which meant that the race started with a peloton of 120 cyclists. From the riders that began this edition, 86 made it to the finish in Milan.

The teams entering the race were:

Route and stages

The route for the race was revealed on 30 January 1976, while a final draft of the race was released on 13 April 1976.

Race overview

During the stage 1A on 21 May, Juan Manuel Santisteban crashed and hit his head, ultimately dying from his injuries.

Patrick Sercu would win both stage 1A and 1B, Roger de Vlaeminck would win stage 2 and the two of them would alternate between wearing the leader's jersey depending on the tie-breakers following the first few stages. De Muynck took over the lead after winning stage 6 by 0:21 over the main field following a crash which left him alone at the front as a group of eight riders were now tied for 2nd in the overall standings :05 behind. The time trial in Stage 7 was won by Francesco Moser with Gimondi placing 2nd seven seconds behind putting Moser into the Maglia Rosa as the overall leader and Gimondi in 2nd seven seconds behind Stage 8 was won by de Vlaeminck as Eddy Merckx crossed the line in 2nd which would be his highest stage placing in this final Giro of his remarkable career. Gimondi crossed in 3rd and while he was by no means a favorite for overall victory, because Moser lost nearly a minute Gimondi would wear the Pink Jersey for the first time since the 1969 Giro.

Over the next ten stages Gimondi maintained his overall lead but on stage 19 Johan de Muynck was able to get away from him and he took over the lead by 0:16. Stage 21 was the final day in the mountains where Merckx took 2nd and Gimondi won the stage. De Muynck finished 9th, but finished in the same time so the overall situation remained the same. Stage 22a was the final ITT and it was here that Gimondi won the Giro. He finished in 6th place 0:43 behind stage winner Joseph Bruyere but 0:44 ahead of de Muynck effectively making him the winner by 0:19.

Classification leadership

There were four main individual classifications contested in the 1976 Giro d'Italia, as well as a team competition. Four of them awarded jerseys to their leaders. The general classification was the most important and was calculated by adding each rider's finishing times on each stage. The rider with the lowest cumulative time was the winner of the general classification and was considered the overall winner of the Giro. The rider leading the classification wore a pink jersey to signify the classification's leadership.

The second classification was the points classification. Riders received points for finishing in the top positions in a stage finish, with first place getting the most points, and lower placings getting successively fewer points. The rider leading this classification wore a purple (or cyclamen) jersey. The mountains classification was the third classification and its leader was denoted by the green jersey. In this ranking, points were won by reaching the summit of a climb ahead of other cyclists. Each climb was ranked as either first, second or third category, with more points available for higher category climbs.  Most stages of the race included one or more categorized climbs, in which points were awarded to the riders that reached the summit first. The Cima Coppi, the race's highest point of elevation, awarded more points than the other first category climbs.  The Cima Coppi for this Giro was the Sella Pass, which was crossed first by Spanish rider Andrés Gandarias during stage 19. The fourth classification, the young rider classification, was a ranking decided the same way as the general classification, but only considered neo-professional cyclists (in their first three years of professional racing). 
 
The final classification, the team classification, awarded no jersey to its leaders. This was calculated by adding together points earned by each rider on the team during each stage through the intermediate sprints, the categorized climbs, stage finishes, etc. The team with the most points led the classification.

There were other minor classifications within the race, including the Campionato delle Regioni classification. The leader wore a blue jersey with colored vertical stripes ("maglia azzurra con banda tricolore verticale"). New to the race for the 1976 edition was the Fiat 131 classification, which was created in honor Juan Manuel Santisteban who died in stage 1A of this edition. The winner of the sprint in each stage received a Fiat 131.

Final standings

General classification

Points classification

Mountains classification

Young rider classification

Combination classification

Campionato delle Regioni classification

Premio 131 Fiat classification

Team points classification

References

 
1976
Giro d'Italia
Giro d'Italia
Giro d'Italia
Giro d'Italia
1976 Super Prestige Pernod